Robert Scheidt (born April 15, 1973) is a Brazilian sailor who has won two gold medals, two silver medals and a bronze from five Olympic Games and a Star Sailors League Final. He is one of the most successful sailors at Olympic Games and one of the most successful Brazilian Olympic athletes, being one of only two to earn five medals along with fellow sailor Torben Grael, and the only Brazilian sailor to win medals in both dinghy and keelboat classes.

He is widely considered to be one of the greatest sailors of all time.

Early career
Scheidt was born in São Paulo to Fritz Scheidt and Karin Kreuger Scheidt, who were both of German descent. His father gave him his first boat when he was nine, and Robert began practising in the Guarapiranga dam. With the help of Dudu Melchert, his coach, he began winning several competitions.

At the age of 11, Scheidt became the South American Champion in the Optimist Class, in Algarrobo, Chile, in 1985 and again in 1986. Because of his wins, he was chosen to represent Brazil in the Optimist World Championship in 1986. This was the turning point of his career and made him decide to quit tennis and focus on sailing.

Because his weight and height exceeded the Optimist recommendations, he began sailing in the Snipe Class, and was second at the 1989 Brazilian Snipe Junior Championship, and champion in 1990, 1991 and 1992. In 1990, he also began sailing in the Lasers and became Brazilian junior champion and was called to represent Brazil in the Junior World Championships, held in Netherlands. Following this championship, he trained in Denmark and Sweden and participated for the first time in the Kiel Week (Kieler Woche).
In 1991, he sailed a good and consistent regatta, won 10 out of the 11 races, and became Laser Junior World Champion in Scotland.

Senior career
In 1995, he won the gold medal in the Pan American Games in Mar del Plata, and his first World Championship. The following year, he graduated from the Mackenzie Presbyterian University in Business Administration.
In this year, 1996, his greatest achievement: after a thrilling and controversial duel with Ben Ainslie (19, UK), he took the Olympic gold medal in Atlanta, in the Laser Class. He also won in 1996 the World Championship, held in Cape Town, South Africa and again in 1997, in Algarrobo, Chile.

In 1999, he won the gold medal in the Pan American Games, in Winnipeg, Canada on Lake Winnipeg, ahead of Mark Mendelblatt of the U.S. and Diego Romero of Argentina.  In 2000, after his fourth World Title, in Cancún, Mexico, there were high expectations that he would win gold in the Olympic Games, in Sydney. But along with the rest of the Brazilian delegation, he failed to win the medal and, after an amazing and controversial battle with Ben Ainslie, from Great Britain, he took home the silver medal.
His fifth world title came in 2001, in Cork, Ireland and his sixth in 2002, in Cape Cod, United States.

In 2003, he became for the third time Pan American Games Champion, with gold in Santo Domingo, Dominican Republic. In 2004, he won the gold medal in the Laser Class in Athens, Ainslie having moved up a weight division to the Finn Class, and won his 6th World Title in Bitez, Turkey, ahead of Mark Mendelblatt.

In March 2005, he was ranked 1st in the world in the Laser, ahead of Paul Goodison of Great Britain, Michael Blackburn of Australia, and Mark Mendelblatt of the U.S.  His last World Title came in 2005, when he was proclaimed champion in his birth country for the first time, in Fortaleza, Brazil.

After this win, he decided to leave the Laser class and focus on two-person racing keelboat Star Class, along with Bruno Prada.  In June 2006, he and Prada won the silver medal at the 2006 Kiel Week in Germany, behind Mark Mendelblatt and crewman Mark Strube.  In August 2006, he and Prada won a silver medal at the Star European Championship against 93 boats in Neustadt, Germany, again behind Mendelblatt and Strube.

He won nine titles since 2003, including the World Title in 2007, in Portugal and a silver medal at the 2008 Olympic Games in Beijing. With this podium, he also became the first Brazilian athlete to win a medal in four consecutive Olympic Games. His four medals put him, along with swimmer Gustavo Borges, behind only sailor Torben Grael as the Brazilian with the most Olympic medals.  He was appointed as the Brazilian flag bearer at the Beijing Olympic Games.

In the 2012 Summer Olympics in London, Scheidt won his fifth Olympic medal, a bronze at the Star. He tied Grael's record and also became the first Brazilian to win medals in five consecutive Olympics, though he wished to win the gold given that would be the last Olympics for the Star Class. To ensure another participation in the 2016 Summer Olympics hosted by Brazil in Rio de Janeiro, Scheidt returned to the Laser in 2013, right away winning the World Championship at the age of 40. In his sixth Olympics, for the first time Scheidt missed the Olympic podium, finishing fourth in spite of winning the medal race. He remained competing in the next Olympic cycle and managed to qualify for the 2020 Olympic Games, becoming the first Brazilian to appear in seven Olympics. Despite reaching the medal race, Scheidt only finished eighth. He has declared that while he will continue sailing, it will not be in the Laser due to the boat's required physicality .

Personal life
On October 25, 2008, he married a Lithuanian sailor and Olympic silver medalist Gintarė Volungevičiūtė in the Town Hall of Kaunas, Lithuania. They have two sons and reside at Lago di Garda, Italy.

Main Titles
Robert Scheidt has already won 125 titles until May 2006, including 68 in Brazil and 57 abroad. His main achievements are:

 Star Class:
 Olympic Games: Silver in Beijing, 2008 and Bronze in London, 2012
 World Championship:
 2007, 2011 (Perth, Australia), 2012 (Hyeres, France)
 Star Sailors League Finals
 2013 (Nassau, Bahamas)
 Pre-Olympic:
 2006
 South American Championship:
 2006
 Brazilian Championship:
 2006
 Laser Class
 Olympic Games:
 Gold in Atlanta, 1996 and Athens, 2004
 Silver in Sydney, 2000
 World Championships:
 Tenerife, Spain, 1995
 Cape Town, South Africa, 1996
 Algarrobo, Chile, 1997
 Cancún, Mexico, 2000
 Cork, Ireland, 2001
 Cape Cod, USA, 2002
 Bitez, Turkey, 2004
 Fortaleza, Brazil, 2005
 Muscat, Oman, 2013
 World ISAF Games:
 Marseille, France, 1997
 World Junior Championship:
 Scotland, 1991
 Pan American Games:
 Mar del Plata, Argentina, 1995
 Winnipeg, Canada, 1999
 Santo Domingo, Dominican Republic, 2003
 Europe Cup:
 1993, 1998, 2000, 2001, 2002, 2005
 South American Championships:
 1992, 1993, 1994, 1997, 2001, 2004
 Brazilian Championships:
 1987 (junior), 1991 (junior), 1992, 1994, 1995, 1998, 1999, 2000, 2001, 2002, 2003, 2004, 2005
 Kiel Week:
 1999, 2000, 2004
 Spa Week:
 1998, 2002
 Optimist Class:
 South American Championship (youth):
 1985, 1986

References

External links
 Robert Scheidt
 

ISAF World Sailor of the Year (male)
1973 births
Living people
Sportspeople from São Paulo
Brazilian male sailors (sport)
Olympic sailors of Brazil
Olympic gold medalists for Brazil
Olympic silver medalists for Brazil
Olympic bronze medalists for Brazil
Olympic medalists in sailing
Medalists at the 2012 Summer Olympics
Medalists at the 2008 Summer Olympics
Medalists at the 2004 Summer Olympics
Sailors at the 1996 Summer Olympics – Laser
Sailors at the 2000 Summer Olympics – Laser
Sailors at the 2004 Summer Olympics – Laser
Sailors at the 2008 Summer Olympics – Star
Sailors at the 2012 Summer Olympics – Star
Pan American Games gold medalists for Brazil
Pan American Games silver medalists for Brazil
Sailors at the 1995 Pan American Games
Sailors at the 1999 Pan American Games
Sailors at the 2003 Pan American Games
Sailors at the 2007 Pan American Games
Sailors at the 2015 Pan American Games
Snipe class sailors
Star class world champions
Brazilian people of German descent
Medalists at the 2000 Summer Olympics
Medalists at the 1996 Summer Olympics
Sailors at the 2016 Summer Olympics – Laser
Pan American Games medalists in sailing
Laser class world champions
World champions in sailing for Brazil
Oath takers at the Olympic Games
Mackenzie Presbyterian University alumni
Medalists at the 1995 Pan American Games
Medalists at the 1999 Pan American Games
Medalists at the 2003 Pan American Games
Medalists at the 2007 Pan American Games
Medalists at the 2015 Pan American Games
Sailors at the 2020 Summer Olympics – Laser